Scythris caroxylella is a moth of the family Scythrididae. It was described by Mark I. Falkovitsh in 1969. It is found in Uzbekistan, Tajikistan and Kazakhstan.

References

caroxylella
Moths described in 1969
Moths of Asia